Northern star is a term for the star Polaris and the UK Nuclear Missile Programme. It may also refer to:

Books and newspapers
 Northern Star, a 1984 play by Stewart Parker
 Northern Star (Chartist newspaper), 1837–1852
 Northern Star (Northern Illinois University), a student newspaper of Northern Illinois University
 Northern Star (newspaper of the Society of United Irishmen), 1792–1797
 The Northern Star, a newspaper in New South Wales, Australia
 Northern Star, a South Australian newspaper that became The Kapunda Herald
 Northern Stars: The Anthology of Canadian Science Fiction, a 2017 anthology edited by David G. Hartwell
 A Northern Star, a play by the Barefoot Theatre Company

Music
 Northern Star Records, a UK based record label
 Northern Star Tour, a 2000 concert tour by Melanie C

Albums
 Northern Star (Groove Armada album), released in 1998
 Northern Star (Melanie C album), released in 1999

Songs
"Northern Star" (song), a song by Melanie C, 1999
 "Northern Star", a song from Hole's 1998 album Celebrity Skin
 "Northern Star", a song by Canadian singer Michel Pagliaro

"Northern Star", a song from The Amazons 2022 album, How Will I Know if Heaven Will Find Me?

Sports
Northern Stars, a New Zealand netball team
TDC Northern Stars, a former UK ice hockey team
Northern Stars, an Israeli Football League team
Northern Stars, an early African-Canadian baseball nine

Transportation
 MS Celtic Star, a ferry in service as the MS Northern Star with P&O Irish Sea and Dart Line from 2002–2004
 SS Empire Caribou, an American Star Lines Inc. cargo ship in service as the SS Northern Star from 1920–1923
 SS Northern Star, a Shaw-Savill liner operating on the UK–Australasia route (1962–1974)

Other uses
 Northern Star Resources, Australian mining company

See also

 Star of the North (disambiguation)
 North Star (disambiguation)
 Northstar (disambiguation)
 Northern (disambiguation)
 Star (disambiguation)
 
 Estrella del norte (disambiguation)
 Estrela do Norte (disambiguation)
 Étoile du Nord (disambiguation)
 Nordstern (disambiguation)
 Nordstar (disambiguation)